José Manfredi Portillo Hernández (born July 15, 1985 in Moncagua) is a Salvadoran footballer.

Club career
Portillo started his career at Third Division side AGABE, and joined Salvadoran Second Division outfit Atlético Chaparrastique in 2003, only to join top level Vista Hermosa a year later.

He returned to Vista Hermosa for the 2011 Clausura tournament, after spending the 2010 Apertura with Atlético Balboa.

International career
Portillo has been called up for the El Salvador U21 as well as the El Salvador U23 national team.

References

External links

1985 births
Living people
People from San Miguel Department (El Salvador)
Association football midfielders
Salvadoran footballers
El Salvador international footballers
C.D. Vista Hermosa footballers
Atlético Balboa footballers
C.D. Dragón footballers